The 2008 INC-CCP MoU is a memorandum of understanding between the Indian National Congress (INC) and the Chinese Communist Party (CCP) signed in 2008.

References

International law
Memoranda
History of the Indian National Congress